Nizhny Bestyakh (Allaraa Besteex) is an urban locality (an urban-type settlement) in Megino-Kangalassky District of the Sakha Republic, Russia, located on the east bank of the Lena River, opposite the republic's capital city of Yakutsk,  from Mayya, the administrative center of the district. As of the 2010 Census, its population was 3,518.

History
The predecessor of Nizhny Bestyakh was called Yarmanka (sometimes spelled Yarmonka or Yarmonga). Here, at the mouth of the Suola River, from about 1750 to 1850, pack horses were loaded for the long journey down to the Okhotsk Coast. A ferry service was founded in 1772 and operated by exiles for five months a year. It was a gathering place for merchants and cargoes bound eastward. There was ample grass for the herds of cattle and pack horses.

Urban-type settlement status was granted to Nizhny Bestyakh in 1971.

Administrative and municipal status
Within the framework of administrative divisions, the urban-type settlement of Nizhny Bestyakh is incorporated within Megino-Kangalassky District as the Settlement of Nizhny Bestyakh. As a municipal division, the Settlement of Nizhny Bestyakh is incorporated within Megino-Kangalassky Municipal District as Nizhny Bestyakh Urban Settlement.

Transportation
Nizhny Bestyakh is the terminus of the only road connection to Yakutsk, the Lena Highway, and is the starting point of the Kolyma Highway, leading to Magadan and the Pacific Ocean coast further east. A ferry allows for transport across the Lena River in summer; in winter, traffic drives directly across the ice on the frozen river. In spring and fall, the crossing is not possible due to the movement of ice.

Nizhny Bestyakh was planned to be the terminus of the Amur–Yakutsk Mainline; however, plans now call for a road and a rail bridge to be built further upstream, allowing a year-round land transport connection with Yakutsk. In future, Nizhny Bestyakh may find itself on the route for planned extensions of the railway towards Magadan. There are plans to make it a transportation hub for northeastern Siberia and to eventually grant it town status. The railhead for construction of the railway reached Nizhny Bestyakh in late 2011. In October 2019, the European Rail Timetable compilers report that a passenger train is now running on alternate days on the Amur-Yakutsk main line, terminating at Nizhny Bestyakh.

A three kilometre car bridge over the Lena River might be ready by 2025 after Vladimir Putin's decisive ‘the situation matured to implementation’ resolution on the draft project, reported Kommersant newspaper in November 2019.

Geography

Climate
Nizhny-Bestyakh has an extremely continental subarctic climate (Köppen Climate Classification Dfd). Despite extreme winters, summers can be quite warm due to lack of any maritime moderation, sometimes exceeding 30 °C (86 °F), similar to nearby Yakutsk. The climate is very dry and most precipitation occurs in warmer months.

References

Notes

Sources
Official website of the Sakha Republic. Registry of the Administrative-Territorial Divisions of the Sakha Republic. Megino-Kangalassky District. 

Urban-type settlements in the Sakha Republic
Populated places on the Lena River